The Glasgow and South Western Railway (G&SWR) 128 class is a class of two 4-6-0 steam locomotives designed by James Manson as a development of his 381 Class 4-6-0s, and were his final locomotive design before he retired. They were built in 1911 by the North British Locomotive Company at its Queens Park works and were considered both good looking and excellent performers.

Numbering

G&SWR
Originally numbered 128 and 129, they became 512 and 513 in the G&SWR renumbering of 1919.

LMS
After the 1923 grouping they became LMS numbers 14673 and 14674, but were scrapped in 1933 and 1934 under the LMS drive for standardisation.

Features
The 128 class, along with the 381 class, were the only G&SWR locomotives to use the 4-6-0 wheel arrangement, and were also the only G&SWR locos to have Belpaire fireboxes. As originally built, No.129 had a Weir feedwater heater mounted on top of the boiler between the chimney and the dome, but this was removed in 1919. The same locomotive operated for a period as a 4-4-2 after it broke a trailing rod.

References

4-6-0 locomotives
128
NBL locomotives
Railway locomotives introduced in 1911
Standard gauge steam locomotives of Great Britain
Scrapped locomotives